Communication Univ. of China station is a station on the  of the Beijing Subway. It is named after the Communication University of China near the station.

Station layout 
The station has 2 at-grade side platforms.

Exits 
There are 3 exits, lettered A, B, and C. Exits B and C are accessible.

References

External links

Beijing Subway stations in Chaoyang District
Railway stations in China opened in 2003
Railway stations in China at university and college campuses